Caladenia longicauda subsp. crassa, commonly known as the Esperance white spider orchid, is a plant in the orchid family Orchidaceae and is endemic to the south-west of Western Australia. It has a single hairy leaf and up to three mostly white flowers with long, broad, spreading lateral sepals and petals, a relatively broad labellum with short, narrow teeth. It grows on the south coast between Bremer Bay and the Cape Arid National Park.

Description
There are four or more rows of pale red calli in the centre of the labellum. Flowering occurs from August to early October.

Taxonomy and naming
Caladenia longicauda was first formally described by John Lindley in 1840 and the description was published in A Sketch of the Vegetation of the Swan River Colony. In 2001 Stephen Hopper and Andrew Brown described eleven subspecies, including subspecies crassa and the descriptions were published in Nuytsia. The subspecies name (crassa) is a Latin word meaning “thick, or "fat" referring to the broadness of the sepals and petals near their bases.

Distribution and habitat
The Esperance white spider orchid occurs between Bremer Bay and the Cape Arid National Park in the Esperance Plains, Jarrah Forest, Mallee and Warren biogeographic regions where it grows in shrubland that is inundated in winter.

Conservation
Caladenia longicauda subsp. crassa  is classified as "not threatened" by the Western Australian Government Department of Parks and Wildlife.

References 

longicauda subsp. crassa
Endemic orchids of Australia
Orchids of Western Australia
Plants described in 2001
Taxa named by Stephen Hopper
Taxa named by Andrew Phillip Brown